Flitton and Greenfield is a civil parish in Bedfordshire, England.  It consists of Flitton and Greenfield.

Flitton and Greenfield are two small hamlets in rural Mid Bedfordshire, situated along the river Flitt and adjoining Flitwick moor.

References

Civil parishes in Bedfordshire
Flitwick